Kələxan is a village and municipality in the Lerik Rayon of Azerbaijan.  It has a population of 942.  The municipality consists of the villages of Kələxan, Kəlvəz, Məhləabad, Hüseynabad, and Gövdərə.

References 

Populated places in Lerik District